William Cowell may refer to:
 William Cowell Sr. (1682–1736), American silversmith
 Butch Cowell (William Harold Cowell, 1887–1940), American football player and coach of football, basketball, and baseball
 Billy Cowell (1902–?), footballer

See also
 Bill Cowell (John William Joseph Cowell, 1887–1956), Australian rules footballer